Kubenskoye may refer to:
Lake Kubenskoye, a lake in Vologda Oblast, Russia
Kubenskoye (rural locality), a rural locality (a selo) in Vologodsky District of Vologda Oblast, Russia